Cite Black Women is a campaign that aims to "rethink the politics of knowledge production" by encouraging the citation of Black women, particularly in academic fields. It was founded in 2017 by Christen A. Smith, an associate professor of African and African diaspora studies and anthropology at the University of Texas at Austin, after a presenter at a conference she attended had plagiarized from a book she had written. Smith made a t-shirt with the words Cite Black Women and began wearing it to conferences, eventually offering the shirts for sale at a meeting of the National Women's Studies Association and selling out of them within 24 hours.  In 2018, Smith started a podcast with the same name. , she continued to sell the shirts and donate the proceeds.

Goals 
Cite Black Women has five core resolutions:
 Read the works of Black women;
 Integrate Black women into the core of your syllabus (in life and in the classroom);
 Acknowledge Black women's intellectual production;
 Make space for Black women to speak;
 Give Black women the space and time to breathe.

The campaign is intended to address the underrepresentation of Black women in academia.

References

External links 
 Official website

Organizations established in 2017
Slogans
Anti-racism
Black feminism
Academic publishing